Johann Georg Ritter von Zimmermann / Johann Georg Zimmermann (8 December 1728, in Brugg, Aargau7 October 1795, in Hanover) was a Swiss philosophical writer, naturalist, and physician. He was the private physician of George III and later Frederick the Great.

Life and works

He studied at Göttingen, where he took the degree of a doctor of medicine, and established his reputation by the dissertation, De irritabilitate (1751). After traveling in the Netherlands and France, he practised as a city physician in Brugg, and wrote Über die Einsamkeit ("Of solitude", 1756, 1784–1785) and Vom Nationalstolz ("Of national pride", 1758). These books made a great impression in Germany, and were translated into almost every European language.

In Zimmermann's character there was a strange combination of sentimentalism, melancholy and enthusiasm; and it was by the free and eccentric expression of these qualities that he excited the interest of his contemporaries. Another of his books, written at Brugg, Von der Erfahrung in der Arzneiwissenschaft ("Of experience in pharmacology", 1764), also attracted much attention. In 1768 he settled at Hanover as private physician of George III with the title of a Hofrat. Catherine II invited him to the court of St Petersburg, but this invitation he declined.

He attended Frederick the Great during that monarch's last illness, and afterwards issued various books about him, of which the chief were Über Friederich den Grossen und meine Unterredung mit ihm kurz vor seinem Tode ("On Frederick the Great and my conversation with him shortly before his death", 1788) and Fragmente über Friedrich den Grossen ("Fragments on Frederick the Great", 1790). According to the Encyclopædia Britannica Eleventh Edition, "[t]hese writings display extraordinary personal vanity, and convey a wholly false impression of Frederick's character."

He has a daughter named Katharina von Zimmermann who died in her 20s from tuberculosis, which also killed her mother and grandmother.

Works 
 J.G. Zimmerman: Solitude or The effect of occasional Retirement (2 Vol., 1800, (1st.ed.) and 1802 (3rd.ed.) Vernon and Hood etc. London, XLVII, 310pp.,(20),354pp.) With Portrait of Zimmerman and etchings by Ridley and biographical sketch
 Solitude; In Two Parts (1840)

Notes

References

Further reading
 A. Rengger, Zimmermann's Briefe an einige seiner Freunde in der Schweiz (1830)
 E. Bodemann, Johann Georg Zimmermann, sein Leben und bisher ungedruckte Briefe an ihn (Hanover, 1878)
 R. Ischer, Johann Georg Zimmermanns Leben und Werke (Bern, 1893)

External links 

 

1728 births
1795 deaths
18th-century Swiss botanists
18th-century Latin-language writers
18th-century male writers
Swiss nobility
Swiss non-fiction writers
Honorary members of the Saint Petersburg Academy of Sciences
18th-century non-fiction writers